Mongpong is a village in the Kalimpong I CD block in the Kalimpong subdivision of the Kalimpong district of West Bengal, India.

Geography

Location

Area overview
The map alongside shows the Kalimpong Sadar subdivision of Kalimpong district. This region is characterized by abruptly rising hills and numerous small streams. It is a predominantly rural area with 77.67% of the population living in rural areas and only 22.23% living in the urban areas. While Kalimpong is the only municipality, Dungra is the sole census town in the entire area. The economy is agro-based and there are 6 tea gardens in the Gorubathan CD block. In 2011, Kalimpong subdivision had a literacy rate of 81.85%, comparable with the highest levels of literacy in the districts of the state. While the first degree college in the subdivision was established at Kalimpong in 1962 the entire subdivision (and now the entire district), other than the head-quarters, had to wait till as late as 2015 (more than half a century) to have their first degree colleges at Pedong and Gorubathan.

Note: The map alongside presents some of the notable locations in the subdivision. All places marked in the map are linked in the larger full screen map.

The place
This village is located on the bank of Teesta river. The Teesta river breaks into several streams here. Mongpong is located on the fringe of Mahananda Wildlife Sanctuary and is home to several birds like brahminy duck, pintail duck, poachard, mallard and bar-headed goose that come here from Central Asia and Ladakh during winter. It is known for its landscape of the Teesta river, mountains and forests, which attract a lot of tourists. Accommodation is available at the Mongpong Forest Rest House managed by the West Bengal Forest Development Corporation.

The tourist attractions in and around Mongpong include Kalijhora, Chapramari Wildlife Sanctuary, Odlabari, and Lataguri Wildlife Sanctuary. Moreover, this is an ideal destination for adventure seekers as it offers trekking, hiking, and bird watching.

Demographics
According to the 2011 Census of India, Mongpong Forest had a total population of 1,111 of which 598 (54%) were males and 513 (46%) were females. There were 151 persons in the age range of 0 to 6 years. The total number of literate people in Mongpong Forest was 668 (69.58% of the population over 6 years).

Transport

Roadways
National Highway 17 connecting Sevoke to Guwahati passes through Mongpong.

Railway
Mongpong has its own railway station called Pillamshat  which lies on New Jalpaiguri–Alipurduar–Samuktala Road Jn, Railway line, but there are no passenger train stoppages in this station. So the nearby Sivok railway station and Bagrakote Railway Station serves Mongpong. The major railway stations nearby are '''Malbazar Junction, Siliguri Junction and New Jalpaiguri Junction.

Airport
Bagdogra Airport is the nearest airport.

References

External links 

 Attractions of Mongpong

Villages in Kalimpong district